Kim Hwang-hyun (born 24 November 1967) is a North Korean speed skater. He competed in three events at the 1984 Winter Olympics.

References

1967 births
Living people
North Korean male speed skaters
Olympic speed skaters of North Korea
Speed skaters at the 1984 Winter Olympics
Place of birth missing (living people)
Speed skaters at the 1986 Asian Winter Games